is an Echizen Railway Katsuyama Eiheiji Line railway station located in the city of Fukui, Fukui Prefecture, Japan.

Lines

Station layout
The station consists of one island platform connected to the station building by a level crossing. The station is unattended.

Adjacent stations

History
It was renamed to its present name in 1934. Operations were halted from June 25, 2001. The station reopened on July 20, 2003 as an Echizen Railway station.

Surrounding area
The station is on the edge of a cluster of homes but otherwise is surrounded by fields.
The Hokuriku Expressway passes overhead to the east, with the Fukui-Kita interchange to the south. However, access to the station from the expressway is difficult and not recommended.
Other points of interest include:
 
University of Fukui, Main Campus (1 km north)

See also
 List of railway stations in Japan

External links

  

Railway stations in Fukui Prefecture
Railway stations in Japan opened in 1919
Katsuyama Eiheiji Line
Fukui (city)